The Intermediate and Immediate geographic regions in Brazil constitute the country's regional geographic division, according to the composition prepared by the Brazilian Institute of Geography and Statistics (IBGE).

The immediate geographic regions are groupings of municipalities whose main reference is the urban network and have a local urban center as a base, through the IBGE analysis. For its elaboration, the connection of nearby cities through dependency relationships and displacement of the population in search of goods, provision of services and work were taken into consideration. Intermediate regions for their part, are groupings of immediate regions that are articulated through the influence of a metropolis, regional capital or representative urban center.

They were instituted in 2017 for updating the Brazilian regional division and correspond to an overview of old Meso and Microregions, respectively, which were in force from 1989.

List of regions
, there were 5,570 municipalities, divided among 133 Intermediate regions and 510 Immediate regions:

References

Demographics of Brazil
.
Subdivisions of Brazil